Mirna Funk (born 1981 in Berlin) is a German journalist, author and individualist feminist.

Life 
Funk studied philosophy and history at Humboldt University of Berlin. She is currently working as a freelance journalist for works such as Der Freitag and Zeit Magazin and publishes texts on culture, society and the arts. In the summer of 2014, she contributed interviews from Israel to Zeit Magazine and wrote about her life there during the 2014 Israel-Gaza conflict. In her article "Ohne mich" [Without Me] Funk wrote about antisemitism and her emigration to Israel.

On 23 July 2015, S. Fischer Verlag published her debut novel Winternähe. Funk received the Uwe Johnson Prize in 2015.
 
In 2022, she finished her work Who Cares? Von der Freiheit, Frau zu sein, in which she promotes an individualist, sex-positive feminism with several anecdotes of her life.

She is the great-granddaughter of the renowned writer Stephan Hermlin and lives in Berlin and Tel Aviv.

Selected works 
 Winternähe, S. Fischer, Frankfurt am Main 2015, 
 Wo ist Papa, 2018, 
 Zwischen Du und Ich, dtv Verlagsgesellschaft, München 2021, 
 Who Cares! Von der Freiheit, Frau zu sein. dtv Verlagsgesellschaft, München 2022,

References

External links

German journalists
Israeli journalists
21st-century German writers
1981 births
Living people
Feminists
Individualist feminists
Sex-positive feminists